Luís Alberto Pérez (born April 6, 1978) is a Nicaraguan former professional boxer who competed from 1996 to 2014. He is a former two weight world champion, having held the IBF super flyweight title from 2003 to 2006, and the IBF bantamweight title in 2007. He also challenged for the WBA super bantamweight interim title in 2008.

Professional career
Pérez competed in 33 professional bouts, finishing with a final record of 27 wins (17 by knockout), 5 losses, and 1 draw. He won two IBF world titles, making three successful defenses of the super flyweight title before being stripped of the title for failing to make weight for one of his planned defenses. He won the bantamweight title in 2007, but lost it in his first defense to Joseph Agbeko.

Professional boxing record

References

External links 
 

1978 births
International Boxing Federation champions
Super-flyweight boxers
Living people
Nicaraguan male boxers
Sportspeople from Managua
Southpaw boxers
World super-flyweight boxing champions
World boxing champions